In computer science, the Method of Four Russians is a technique for speeding up algorithms involving Boolean matrices, or more generally algorithms involving matrices in which each cell may take on only a bounded number of possible values.

Idea 

The main idea of the method is to partition the matrix into small square blocks of size  for some parameter , and to use a lookup table to perform the algorithm quickly within each block. The index into the lookup table encodes the values of the matrix cells on the upper left of the block boundary prior to some operation of the algorithm, and the result of the lookup table encodes the values of the boundary cells on the lower right of the block after the operation. Thus, the overall algorithm may be performed by operating on only  blocks instead of on  matrix cells, where  is the side length of the matrix. In order to keep the size of the lookup tables (and the time needed to initialize them) sufficiently small,  is typically chosen to be .

Applications 

Algorithms to which the Method of Four Russians may be applied include:
 computing the transitive closure of a graph, 
 Boolean matrix multiplication, 
 edit distance calculation,
 sequence alignment,
 index calculation for binary jumbled pattern matching.
In each of these cases it speeds up the algorithm by one or two logarithmic factors.

The Method of Four Russians matrix inversion algorithm published by Bard is implemented in M4RI library for fast arithmetic with dense matrices over F2. M4RI is used by SageMath and the PolyBoRi library.

History 

The algorithm was introduced by V. L. Arlazarov, E. A. Dinic, M. A. Kronrod, and I. A. Faradžev in 1970. The origin of the name is unknown;  explain:
The second method, often called the "Four Russians'" algorithm, after the cardinality and nationality of its inventors, is somewhat more "practical" than the algorithm in Theorem 6.9.
All four authors worked in Moscow, Russia at the time.

Notes

References
. Original title: "Об экономном построении транзитивного замыкания ориентированного графа", published in Доклады Академии Наук СССР 134 (3), 1970.

Numerical linear algebra